Christopher J. Lillicrap (born 14 February 1949 in Plymouth, Devon) is a British television presenter, writer and composer. He is best known for being a children's TV presenter in the 1970s and '80s, and has numerous writing credits, including Rainbow, Fab Lab and Fimbles. He presented We'll Tell You a Story, and Flicks between 1983 and 1988. Lillicrap is also the creator of the educational television show, El Nombre. His stage work includes pantomime, writing for the Proper Pantomime Company, in whose productions he starred as the dame.

He has co-written numerous pantomimes and children's shows for the theatre with his actress wife Jeanette Ranger. Their musical Monty Moonbeam's Magnificent Mission won the TMA/Martini Award for Best Show for Young People.

Lillicrap no longer performs in pantomime following his wife's stroke. Lillicrap lived for many years in Farnborough, Hampshire before moving to the Greek island of Symi, where he wrote his first novel, Midas, under the pseudonym Dominic Ranger, published by Matador in 2013.

References

External links 
Biography by Noel Gay Organisation

English television presenters
Living people
1949 births
BBC television presenters